Mark A. Hashimoto is a United States Marine Corps major general who has served as the Mobilization Assistant to the Commander of the United States Indo-Pacific Command since April 2021. Previously, he served as the Commanding General of Force Headquarters Group of the Marine Forces Reserve from August 2018 to April 2021.

References

External links

Year of birth missing (living people)
Living people
Place of birth missing (living people)
United States Marine Corps generals